Bandar-e Gaz (also Romanized as Bandar-i-Gaz, Bandar-i-Jaz and Bander Gaz) is a city and capital of Bandar-e Gaz County, in Golestan Province, Iran. At the 2006 census its population was 17,923, in 4,679 families.

Bandar Gaz is situated in the south eastern fringes of the Gorgan Bay (:ru:Горганский залив), at a distance of 20 km south of Bandar Torkaman and 48 km from Gorgan. Before the establishment of Bandar Turkaman, this port was the most important commercial port in west of Mazandaran, Semnan and Khorasan. Bandar Gaz became an industrial center due to its location in the commercial highway in northwest Iran. The oil-extraction, rice-grinding and cotton purifying factories were established in this town. The coastal areas of the town include wetlands, groves and wildlife. The people of Bandar-e-Gaz speak the Mazanderani language.

See also

Gaz (candy)

References 

Populated places in Bandar-e Gaz County
Cities in Golestan Province